Electronic Markets - The International Journal on Networked Business is a quarterly double-blind peer-reviewed academic journal that covers research on the implications of information systems on e-commerce. It was established in 1991 and is published by Springer Science+Business Media.  Since 2010, Electronic Markets is included in the Social Sciences Citation Index. The editors-in-chief are Rainer Alt (Leipzig University) and Hans-Dieter Zimmermann (FHS St. Gallen University of Applied Sciences).

Abstracting and indexing 
The journal is abstracted and indexed in Scopus, Inspec, ProQuest, Academic OneFile, Current Contents/Social & Behavioral Sciences, International Bibliography of the Social Sciences, and the Social Sciences Citation Index. According to the Journal Citation Reports, the journal has a 2017 impact factor of 3.818.

References

External links 
 Official Website
 Copyright policies & self-archiving

Business and management journals
Information systems journals
German economics journals
Springer Science+Business Media academic journals
Publications established in 1991
English-language journals
Quarterly journals